Sir Robert Constable (c. 1522 – 12 November 1591), of Newark-on-Trent, Nottinghamshire, and the Minories, London, was an English soldier and Member of Parliament.

Biography
Robert Constable, born about 1522, was the second son of Sir Robert Constable, of Everingham. and his wife Katherine, daughter of George Manners, 11th Baron de Ros of Helmsley Castle, and Anne, only daughter and heiress of Sir Thomas St. Leger.

Constable's elder brother Marmaduke who was about thirty-eight years of age, succeeded to the family property in 1558 when their father died. Marmaduke died on 13 May 1560.

As a younger son, Constable had to largely make his own way. His marriage to Christiana Dabridgecourt may have occasioned his decision to settle in Newark-on-Trent, where her first husband, Anthony Forster, had been an alderman. Constable later acquired from the Hospital of St. Leonard the lease of a property known as the Spittal on the northern outskirts of Newark. According to Hasler it is almost certain that he was the Robert Constable, gentleman pensioner, who towards the end of the reign of Queen Mary, as a reward for his service, was made constable of Queenborough Castle. It is also almost certain that he was the Sir Robert Constable listed by Segar as one of the 'lords and gentlemen' who had participated in Queen Elizabeth's Accession Day tournaments.

Constable served under Thomas Radclyffe, 3rd Earl of Sussex, in the campaign after the Northern Rebellion of 1569. On 17 April 1570 he went into Scotland with Lord Hunsdon to Jedburgh, took Ferniehirst Castle, and burnt Hawick, Branxholme and Bedrule. On 27 April he joined the siege of Hume Castle. He was knighted by Sussex at Berwick on 11 May 1570, together with William Drury, Thomas Manners, and George Carey, who were captains in the army sent into Scotland on the following day to assist the Earl of Lennox in the Marian civil war at Glasgow.

Constable received leases of lands 'for his service to the Queen in the wars', and 'for his service during the late rebellion in the north', and later composed a treatise on the 'Ordering of a Camp'. In 1575 he was appointed Marshal of Berwick. On 2 February 1576 he wrote to his kinsman, Edward Manners, 3rd Earl of Rutland, son and heir of his first cousin, Henry Manners, 2nd Earl of Rutland, complaining that he had not received any imprest money, and requesting the Earl to pass on his thanks to Sir Francis Walsingham, for 'I have not found so great a friend as he. I know that I have this friendship for your sake, for I was a mere stranger to him'. Constable was soon requesting to be relieved of the position. On 25 May 1576 he wrote to the Earl that he had been 'in very good hope that I should have been discharged of this office, but I am now stayed'. He complained that 'No one ever lived here at so great a charge as I do', and that the garrison had been unpaid since Michaelmas. In 1577 he was still at Berwick, from which he wrote on 25 March that he had been 'very sick'. In about September 1577 he wrote to the Earl that 'Riding about the Queen's works here my horse has fallen upon me and bruised me so much that I am not able to stir out of my bed. . . The fall was so great that my sword was broken into three pieces'. He complained that he could 'get no help of physic', and although he hoped to escape danger from the injury, 'it will be very hard in consideration of my old years'. He was finally allowed to resign in August 1578. Lord Burghley commented that Constable had been 'beggared' as a result of his time spent at Berwick.

According to Hasler, Constable now lived "as a country gentleman" on his properties in Nottinghamshire. Nevertheless, in May 1585 he was in London. In a letter dated 18 May 1585 to the Earl of Rutland he described a recent event at Greenwich:

I have been before her Majesty with my people at Greenwich, where Mr Treasurer and I did show it in such sort that it was to her Majesty's contentment, and well liking of all the whole people, and such a skirmish maintained as the like hath not been at any time, for it never ceased until her Majesty gave commandment it should cease. And after the skirmish she did cause that we should pause awhile for the cooling of their pieces, and so to begin, which latter skirmish exceeded that the French ambassador and all the counsellors did greatly commend it .... And so every captain went with his company, [and] marched home to London that night.

Constable reported further that the Queen had sent Sir Walter Raleigh to him with her thanks, and that later she had let him kiss her hand, saying that she had 'taken such order for me as I should not mislike of'. It may have been as a result of this performance that Constable was appointed Lieutenant-General of the Ordnance at some time before 4 August 1588.

In 1587 Constable was a principal mourner at the Earl of Rutland's funeral. The precise date of Constable's own death is unknown. He was buried in Holy Trinity Minories on 12 November 1591.

Family
Constable married, before 1562, Christiana Dabridgecourt, widow of Anthony Forster, and daughter of John Dabridgecourt of Langdon Hall, Warwickshire. Their only child was the poet, Henry Constable.

Notes

References

Further reading

External links
  Pedigree of Constable, Visitation of Nottinghamshire, p. 40
Constable, Sir Marmaduke (1480–1545), History of Parliament
 Constable, Robert (before 1495 – 1558), History of Parliament
 Letter from Sir Robert Constable re Archibald Douglas, Lambeth Palace Library
 Biographies of Christiana Dabridgecourt and her sister, Cecily Dabridgecourt
 Constable, Sir Robert (c.1522–1591), History of Parliament
 Forster, Anthony (1501–59), History of Parliament
 Documents concerning Sir Robert Constable in the British Library

1522 births
1591 deaths
English knights
People from Newark-on-Trent
English MPs 1584–1585
English MPs 1586–1587